Rifat Latifi (born 1955) is a Kosovar Albanian–American surgeon and former Minister of Health of Kosovo.

Latifi was born in Kllodernica, Skenderaj, and completed secondary education in Pristina. He received his MD degree from the University of Prishtina in 1982 and emigrated to the United States later that year.

He initially worked as a researcher in Houston, Texas, then completed his residency in surgery at the University of Cleveland and Yale University. He completed a fellowship in traumatology and surgical critical care at the New York College of Medicine.

Latifi has worked with clinical centers in Texas, Philadelphia, New York, Qatar, and Arizona. He has taught at the University of Arizona and served as president of the Arizona Chapter of the American College of Surgeons. He pioneered telemedicine in Kosovo and Albania, and authored tens of articles published in scientific journals.

He was appointed minister of health in the second Kurti government on 16 November 2021. He resigned on 6 October 2022.

References

Kosovan surgeons
Government ministers of Kosovo
Cleveland State University alumni
Yale University alumni
University of Arizona faculty
1955 births
Living people
University of Pristina alumni
Date of birth missing (living people)
People from Skenderaj